Peter John Ambrose Calvocoressi (17 November 1912 – 5 February 2010) was a British lawyer, Liberal politician, historian, and publisher. He served as an intelligence officer at Bletchley Park during World War II.

Early years
Calvocoressi was born in Karachi, now in Pakistan, to a family of Greek origins from the island of Chios. His mother, Irene (née Ralli), was descended from one of the founders of Ralli Brothers, who were prominent Greek families of Chios who came to London at the time of the Greek Diaspora. When he was three months old, the family moved to Liverpool, England.

Calvocoressi's father Pandia had spent the first seven years of his life in Manchester and the next ten at San Stefano (on the outskirts of Istanbul). He attended the Sorbonne from the age of 17 for three years and then joined the family firm in New York. Pandia Calvocoressi and Irene Ralli  married in London in 1910. Shortly afterwards Pandia was posted to India where Calvocoressi was born. His mother and maternal grandmother were both born in India but spent most of their lives in England.

In 1926 he was elected a scholar of Eton in second place, a position which he retained for the greater part of the next five years. Switching from the standard Classical curriculum to History, he was taught by, among others, the young Robert Birley. At Balliol College, Oxford, in 1931–1934, he was tutored in Modern History mainly by B. H. Sumner and V. H. Galbraith, obtaining a First.

Career
He was called to the Bar in 1935 and worked in Chancery Chambers until the outbreak of World War II. He spent most of the war as an RAF Intelligence officer at GC&CS Bletchley Park. He worked in 'Hut 3', where decrypted Enigma messages were translated and analysed, and Ultra intelligence was prepared for dispatch to commanders in the field. Calvocoressi rose to be head of the Air Section, which dealt with Luftwaffe intelligence. In summer 1945, he was accredited by British Intelligence to obtain evidence for all four Chief Prosecutors at the International Military Tribunal at Nuremberg. As a member of the British prosecution team, he cross-examined former German Field Marshal Gerd von Rundstedt during the trial.  Calvocoressi later advised the US Chief Prosecutor (General Telford Taylor), who had been his Bletchley colleague, in some of the American follow-up trials (1946–1949).

In 1945, he contested the General Election, as the Liberal candidate for Nuneaton, finishing third.
 
In 1950–1955 he worked at the Royal Institute for Foreign Affairs (Chatham House), writing five volumes in the series of Annual Surveys of International Affairs, which had previously been written by Arnold Toynbee. From 1955 to 1966, he was a partner in the publishing firms of Chatto and Windus and the Hogarth Press. From 1966 to 1973, he was Reader in International Relations at the University of Sussex, a post which was created for him.

In 1973 he was enticed back to publishing by the offer of the newly created post of Editor-in-Chief of Penguin Books. He was appointed Publisher and Chief Executive of Penguin in the following year. But he fell into disagreements with Penguin's parent company Pearson Longman, and was removed in 1976.

During this period (1955-1976) he was for ten years a part-time member of the United Nations Sub-Commission on the Promotion and Protection of Human Rights, and was Chairman of the Africa Bureau, the London Library, Chios Charities, and Open University Enterprises Ltd. He also served on the governing bodies of Chatham House, the Institute of Strategic Studies, and Amnesty International.

He wrote twenty books, mostly on contemporary history; one of these – World Politics Since 1945 – passed through nine editions. Threading My Way, an autobiography, appeared in 1994. He set private life before and above his career and never had cause to question this priority.

In 1990, he was awarded an honorary doctorate by the Open University.

Bibliography
 Nuremberg: The Facts, the Law and the Consequences, 1948
 Survey of International Affairs 1947-1948, 1952
 Survey of International Affairs 1949-1950, 1953
 Survey of International Affairs 1951, 1954
 Survey of International Affairs 1952, 1955
 Survey of International Affairs 1953, 1956
 Middle East Crisis (with Guy Wint), 1957
 South Africa and World Opinion, 1961
 World Order and New States: Problems of Keeping the Peace, 1962
 Suez: Ten Years After (with Anthony Moncrieff), 1967
 World Politics Since 1945, 1968; 2008, 9th ed.
 Total War: Causes and Courses of the Second World War (with Guy Wint and John Pritchard), 1972 
 The British Experience 1945-75, 1978
 Freedom to Publish (with Ann Bristow), 1980
 Top Secret Ultra, 1980
 From Byzantium to Eton: A Memoir of a Millennium, 1980
 New Alignments (with Philip Windsor), 1982
 Independent Africa and the World, 1985
 A Time for Peace, 1987
 Who's Who in the Bible, 1987
 Resilient Europe: A Study of the Years 1870-2000, 1991
 The Cold War as Episode, 1993
 Threading My Way, 1994 (autobiography)
 Fall Out: World War II and the Shaping of Postwar Europe, 1997
 The Penguin History of the Second World War, 2 vol., 1999
 World Politics 1945-2000, 2000 (= 8th ed. of World Politics Since 1945)
 Television In College Education, 2005

See also
History of cryptography
Cryptanalysis of the Enigma

Notes
 Interview with Peter Calvocoressi by Roger Adelson

References

Sources

External links
 Imperial War Museum Interview from 1987
 Imperial War Museum Interview from 1993

1912 births
2010 deaths
Military personnel of British India
Academics of the University of Sussex
Alumni of Balliol College, Oxford
British historians
British people of Greek descent
GCHQ cryptographers
People educated at Eton College
People from Karachi
Bletchley Park people
Royal Air Force personnel of World War II
Chatham House people
Foreign Office personnel of World War II
English barristers